Beech Fork State Park is a state park located in Cabell County and Wayne County, West Virginia. The park is located on the tailwater shores of Beech Fork Lake, a flood control impoundment of the U.S. Army Corps of Engineers on the Beech Fork of Twelvepole Creek. Since its development in the mid-1970s, Beech Fork State Park has proven to be a popular recreation spot for the residents of nearby Barboursville and Huntington, West Virginia, as well as those living in the surrounding region.

Access to the park is also available from Exits 8, 15, and 20 of I-64.  The Beech Fork Lake Dam and Marina are about a 20-mile (40-minute) drive from the park.

Corps of Engineers lake rules restrict boat motors to 10-hp or smaller.

Features

 Boat launch access to Beech Fork Lake
 4 Campgrounds with 275 campsites total (including 49 with full hookups, 37 primitive and 189 with electrical power)
 6 cabins
 50-meter swimming pool
 Hiking trails
 Mountain biking trails
 Fishing access 
 Tennis court
 Volleyball court
 Basketball court
 Softball field
 Picnic area
 Dump station
 Water fill station
 Paddle boat and canoe rental ( peak season only )
 100-yard rifle and pistol range
Pontoon and fishing boat rentals are available from the privately operated Beech Fork Lake Marina.

Accessibility

Accessibility for the disabled was assessed by West Virginia University. The assessment found the campground, picnic areas, swimming pool, and the doors and ramps of public buildings to be accessible. The 2005 assessment found issues with signage on buildings and parking lots, and with aspects of access to restrooms.

See also

List of West Virginia state parks

References

External links
 
U.S. Army Corps of Engineers Beech Fork Website

State parks of West Virginia
Protected areas of Cabell County, West Virginia
Protected areas of Wayne County, West Virginia
Protected areas established in 1978
Campgrounds in West Virginia